Diplopseustis perieresalis is a species of moth in the family Crambidae. It is widespread in the Oriental region, Australia and New Zealand, but was introduced to the Western Palaearctic realm, where it quickly expanded its range, and where it is now found in Great Britain, the Netherlands, Belgium, Germany, France, Switzerland, Spain, Portugal and the Canary Islands. In the Afrotropics, a single female specimen has been collected in 1904 in Sudan.

The wingspan is about 15 mm.

The larvae very likely feed on some part of the New Zealand endemic sedge makura (Carex secta), based on observations in Central Otago.

References

Spilomelinae
Moths described in 1859
Moths of Africa
Moths of Europe
Moths of Japan
Moths of New Zealand
Taxa named by Francis Walker (entomologist)